The 1982 Lada Classic was the 1982 edition of the professional invitational snooker tournament, which took place from 10 to 13 January 1982.
The tournament was played at the Civic Centre in Oldham, Greater Manchester, and featured eight professional players.

Steve Davis made the first televised maximum 147 break in snooker history during his quarter-final match against John Spencer, winning a Lada car for his efforts. Terry Griffiths won the tournament, beating Davis 9–8 in the final.

Main draw

Final

Century breaks
147, 105, 101  Steve Davis

References

Classic (snooker)
Classic
Classic
Classic
Sport in Oldham